Francis Nelson McCrea (January 14, 1852 – October 30, 1926) was a Canadian lumber merchant, manufacturer, and politician.

He was the Liberal Member of Parliament for the Quebec riding of Town of Sherbrooke from 1911 to 1925.

He married Judith Fannie Ella Wakefield and they had four sons and four daughters.

He died in Sherbrooke on October 30, 1926.

Electoral record

References

External links
 

1852 births
1926 deaths
Liberal Party of Canada MPs
Members of the House of Commons of Canada from Quebec
People from Centre-du-Québec
Politicians from Sherbrooke